Siegfried Lorenz (born 21 June 1933) is a German athlete. He competed in the men's hammer throw at the 1960 Summer Olympics.

References

1933 births
Living people
Athletes (track and field) at the 1960 Summer Olympics
German male hammer throwers
Olympic athletes of the United Team of Germany
People from Kętrzyn
Sportspeople from Warmian-Masurian Voivodeship